Bellona is a hamlet in Yates County, New York, United States. Bellona has a post office with ZIP code 14415, which opened on May 14, 1816.

References

Hamlets in Yates County, New York
Hamlets in New York (state)